Sriram Panda (born c. 1954) is an Indian Odia actor, director and a screenplay writer hailing from the Nabarangpur district, Odisha, India.

Career
Sriram Panda started his film career in Dhir Biswal's Dharitri directed by Nitai Palit in 1972, which was a success. In 1975 he starred in the lead role of Jajabara directed by Trimurti which was a huge hit & is still regarded as one of the classic films to be ever made in Odia film industry. A coloured version of Jajabara was later released which garnered high popularity among the masses. In 1976 he starred in 6 films 4 of which were commercially successful. He emerged as Superstar of Odisha in the 1980s and 1990s. In 1992, at the peak of his career, he quit the film industry to join the Bihar School of Yoga at Munger in Bihar as a Yoga preacher and renamed himself Swami Nitya Chaitanya.

He wrote, directed, and produced the movie Kurukshetra (1988).

Filmography

References

External links
 

Living people
Ollywood
Male actors in Odia cinema
20th-century Indian male actors
1954 births
Male actors from Odisha